Mount Vaea is a 472 m summit overlooking Apia, the capital of Samoa located on the north central coast of Upolu island. The mountain is situated south about 3 km inland from Apia township and harbour. The settlement at the foothills on the northern side of the mountain is called Lalovaea (below Vaea in Samoan).

Connections to Robert Louis Stevenson 
Mount Vaea is best known as the burial place of the Scottish writer Robert Louis Stevenson, who lived the last four years of his life in Samoa before his death on 3 December 1894. Stevenson, who had lived on the east side of Mount Vaea, had chosen the mountain top as his final resting place. The day following his death, his coffin was carried by Samoans to the summit for burial. The steep path to his grave is called the 'Road of Loving Hearts.' It takes about an hour to ascend by foot. Stevenson was called Tusitala (Samoan language: tusi book, tala writer) by the people of Samoa.

Inscribed on Stevenson's tomb is his epitaph:

Under the wide and starry sky,
Dig the grave and let me lie.
Glad did I live and gladly die,
And I laid me down with a will.

This be the verse you grave for me:
Here he lies where he longed to be;
Home is the sailor, home from the sea,
And the hunter home from the hill.

The ashes of his wife Fanny Stevenson, who died in California in 1914, were taken back by her daughter to Samoa in 1915 and buried beside her husband. The bronze plaque for Fanny bears her Samoan name 'Aolele' (Flying Cloud in Samoan).

Stevenson's estate and colonial home, Villa Vailima, is now the Robert Louis Stevenson Museum in his honour. It is situated in the village of Vailima at the eastern foot of Mount Vaea.

Memorial and Scenic Reserve

Part of the 1958 Law states;

See also
Chanel College, Moamoa

References

External links

Mountains of Samoa
History of Samoa
Robert Louis Stevenson
Populated places in Tuamasaga
Nature conservation in Samoa
Protected areas of Samoa